Captain Rock was a mythical Irish folk hero, and the name used for the agrarian rebel group he represented in the south-west of Ireland from 1821 to 1824.

Arising following the harvest failures in 1816 and 1821, the drought in 1818 and the fever epidemic of 1816-19. Rockites, similar to the earlier Whiteboys, targeted landlords who were members of the Protestant Ascendancy. Captain Rock (or Rockites) were responsible for up to a thousand incidents of beatings, murder, arson and mutilation in the short time they were active. The rebel actions waned from 1824 onwards, with the return of "a bearable level of subsistence". Captain Rock was the symbol for retaliation by "an underclass which had nothing left to lose".

Over this period and in subsequent years, well into the nineteenth century, threatening letters signed by "Captain Rock" (as well as other symbolic nicknames, such as "Captain Steel" or "Major Ribbon") issued warnings of violent reprisals against landlords and their agents who tried to arbitrarily put up rents, collectors of tithes for the Anglican Church of Ireland, government magistrates who tried to evict tenants, and informers who fingered out Rockites to the authorities.

Notable contemporary representations in popular culture include a hand-colored lithograph of "Captain Rock's Banditti swearing in a new Member", caricatures of "Lady Rock" depicting Rockites cross-dressing as women when committing act of violence, and the painting "The Installation of Captain Rock" by the celebrated romantic artist Daniel Maclise (exhibited in London in 1834). The notable poet and author Thomas Moore wrote a popular book titled Memoirs of Captain Rock (1824) and the lesser-known female author Elizabeth Charlotte Tonna wrote  The Rockite: An Irish Story (1829).

References

Further reading
 Donnelly, James S. Captain Rock: The Irish Agrarian Rebellion of 1821–1824  (2009)
 Christianson, Gale E. "Secret Societies and Agrarian Violence in Ireland, 1790-1840." Agricultural History (1972): 369-384. in JSTOR
 Beiner, Guy. "Captain Rock", Béascna, no. 6 (2010): 193-201

19th-century conflicts
Rebellions in Ireland
Irish agrarian protest societies
Irish secret societies
1820s in Ireland